The Development Alternatives Group is a social enterprise and think tank organization based in New Delhi, India involved in sustainable development.

It is composed of divisions that focus on the fields of green economic development, social empowerment and environmental management. DA works at local, national, and global levels and its partners and clients include village households and communities, civil society organisations, local and state governments, agencies and ministries of the Government in India, multilateral agencies and private sector institutions across India, and a growing number of partners in South Asia, South-East Asia, and Africa.

History 
In November 2022, Development Alternative hosted an event on creating green-enterprises.

Group 
The Development Alternatives Group comprises the not-for-profit flagship Society for Development Alternatives (DA), the business-oriented incubator Technology and Action for Rural Advancement (TARA), and its commercial subsidiaries, which include TARA Machines and Tech Services (TMTS), TARA Environmental Services Pvt Ltd (TARAenviro), TARAhaat Information and Marketing Services Ltd (TARAhaat), TARA Nirman Kendra (TNK) and DESI Power Orchha Pvt Ltd (DESI Power).

TARA Machines and Tech Services (TMTS) 
TARA Machines and Tech Services Pvt. Ltd., delivers green business solutions to small and medium enterprises (SMEs) for building construction, waste recycling, and handmade paper production. TMTS is a specialist company in Eco-concrete Technology, Eco-Kiln Technology, Fly Ash Technology, and Recycling Technology.

DESI Power Orchha Pvt Ltd (DESI Power) 
Decentralised Energy Systems (India) Pvt. Ltd., more commonly known as DESI Power, is an independent rural power producer involved in providing electricity and energy services.

TARAhaat Information and Marketing Services Ltd (TARAhaat) 
Launched in 2000, TARAhaat Information and Marketing Services Ltd. introduced Information Technology (IT) services in rural India.  These services include literacy, vocational skills, and other products needed in rural communities.

TARA Environmental Services Pvt Ltd (TARAenviro) 
Incorporated in 2008, TARAenviro, a part of the Development Alternatives Group, is a private company that markets water testing kits and filters under the Jal-TARA brand, which helps test the potability of water and offers cost-effective solutions for improving water quality.

TARAenviro products:
 Jal – TARA Water Testing Kits
 Jal – TARA Water Filters
 TARA Aqua-check vials

Development Alternatives Programs

Radio Bundelkhand

Based at TARAgram Orchha, DA’s Technology Centre at Tikamgarh district of Madhya Pradesh, Radio Bundelkhand is an ICT-based community radio initiative started by Development Alternatives (DA) and jointly managed by the local community and DA.

References

Environmental organisations based in India
Organizations established in 1982
1982 establishments in Delhi
Organisations based in Delhi